Tison Pugh is a literary scholar. He has been a professor of English at the University of Central Florida (UCF) since 2006. Before coming to UCF, Pugh was a lecturer at the University of California, Irvine, in the 2000–2001 academic year.

In 2019, Pugh was named a Pegasus Professor at UCF, which the university describes as its "highest academic award".

Publications 
 Queering Medieval Genres (2004)
 Sexuality and Its Queer Discontents in Middle English Literature (2008)
 Innocence, Heterosexuality, and the Queerness of Children's Literature (2011)
  An Introduction to Geoffrey Chaucer (2013)
 Chaucer's (Anti-) Eroticisms and the Queer Middle Ages (2014)
 Precious Perversions: Humor, Homosexuality, and the Southern Literary Canon (2016)
 Harry Potter and Beyond: On J. K. Rowling’s Fantasies and Other Fictions (2020)

References

External links 
 

University of Central Florida faculty
University of California, Irvine faculty
Year of birth missing (living people)
Living people